The Egypt women's national squash team represents Egypt in international squash team competitions, and is governed by Egyptian Squash Association.

Since 1994, Egypt has won three World Squash Team Open titles. Their most recent title came in 2016.

Current team
 Nour El Sherbini
 Nour El Tayeb
 Nouran Gohar

Results

World Team Squash Championships

See also
 Squash in Egypt
 World Team Squash Championships
 Egypt men's national squash team

References

Squash teams
Women's national squash teams
Squash
Squash in Egypt